Helena Czaplińska (died 1651), was the second wife of Bohdan Khmelnytsky, Hetman of Zaporizhian Host (r. 1648–1657). She was an influential figure among the Zaporizhian Cossacks and known as "Helen of the Steppe".  Initially married to Daniel Czapliński, her influence was seen as a threat as she was suspected to  betray her second husband the hetman in favor of her loyalties of her former marriage. She was famously executed for treason by her stepson Tymofiy Khmelnytsky during the absence of her spouse.

References

1651 deaths
Year of birth missing
17th-century Ukrainian people
People from the Cossack Hetmanate
17th-century executions